Yang Jun is the name of several people:

Sports
Yang Jun (martial artist) (born 1968), tai chi chuan master and teacher
Yang Jun (footballer) (born 1981), Chinese footballer
Yang Jun (water polo) (born 1988), Chinese female water polo player

Others
Yang Jun (minister) (died 291), minister of Jin dynasty
Yang Jun (prince) (571–600), prince of Sui dynasty
Jun Yang (artist) (born 1975), Chinese-Austrian contemporary artist